Broken Springs (original title Broken Springs: Shine of the Undead Zombie Bastards, distributed under title 101 Zombies) is an independent horror film written, directed, produced, and edited by Virginia native Neeley Lawson, as his first feature effort.  It stars Teague Quillen, Jake Lawson and Shannon Wallen.  The movie was filmed in late fall of 2008, mainly in Gate City, Virginia, U.S. and Rogersville, Tennessee, U.S.

Plot
The movie centers on three high school students whose world is turned upside down by tainted moonshine which turns everyone who drinks it into a flesh eating zombie. It does not take long for the whole town to be overrun.

Cast

 Teague Quillen as Ken
 Travis Moody as Dave
 Brandon Jenkins as Brandon
 Shannon Wallen as Billy Jack
 Sean Loepp as Ron

 Jake Lawson as Flea Market Preacher
 Hunter Roberts as Cop
 Debbie Green as Ken's Mom
 Jeff Bobo as Danny
 Brent McConnell as Drunk

Release
Broken Springs had its world premier on June 4, 2010 in Hollywood at the Dances With Films festival on Sunset Boulevard in Hollywood, California.  The second showing was September 24, 2010 at the Chicago Horror Film Festival. Broken Springs also screened at the inaugural Anaheim International Film Festival, the Southern Appalachian International Film Festival, The Spooky Movie Film Festival (aka Washington D.C. International Horror Festival), and the Telluride Horror Show Film Festival.  A teaser trailer was released on YouTube on October 26, 2009.

In 2012, the film was distributed under the title 101 Zombies and became available for rent on YouTube, Charter Cable On-Demand and Amazon.

Soundtrack
The Soundtrack featured songs from The Flow of Opinion and Jake McMurray.

Critical reception
Variety wrote that the film borrowed "equally from George A. Romero and Joe Dante for its wit and politics", and that "fans exhausted with big-budget zombie movies will be refreshed" by the film.

OC Weekly reviewer Matt Coker remarked, "How can one not love a film with 'undead', 'zombie”' and 'bastards' in the same title?", "barely" recommended the film, writing that as it acts as an "homage of sorts" to other low/no budget zombie films, and has "just enough humor and ironic stereotypes to make up for the poor acting, bad lighting and looooooong build up to the inevitable conclusion".

References

External links
 
 

2010 films
American zombie films
Films shot in Tennessee
Films shot in Virginia
American independent films
2010 horror films
2010 directorial debut films
2010s English-language films
2010s American films